Yevgeny Konstantinovich Frolov (born 5 February 1988) is a Russian professional football player. He plays as a goalkeeper for Krylia Sovetov Samara.

Club career
On 29 June 2019, he signed with PFC Sochi.

On 2 February 2020, he signed a 2.5-year contract with Krylia Sovetov Samara.

In April 2020 he gave an interview to sports journalist in which he criticized President Putin, saying he failed to take tangible action to support businesses and the population amid the Coronavirus pandemic in Russia.

On 30 May 2022, Frolov signed a new 2-year contract with Krylia Sovetov.

Career statistics

References

External links
 
 

1988 births
Sportspeople from Krasnoyarsk Krai
Living people
Russian footballers
Association football goalkeepers
FC Mordovia Saransk players
FC Znamya Truda Orekhovo-Zuyevo players
FC Torpedo Moscow players
FC Dynamo Moscow players
FC Sakhalin Yuzhno-Sakhalinsk players
FC Kuban Krasnodar players
FC Baltika Kaliningrad players
FC Orenburg players
PFC Sochi players
PFC Krylia Sovetov Samara players
Russian Premier League players
Russian First League players
Russian Second League players